Mawson Corridor is a sea passage between grounded icebergs on the approach to Mawson Station at Holme Bay, Antarctica. The northern end at 66°45′S 63°20′E is sharply defined and coincides with the edge of the continental shelf; from there it bears 202°. The passage was discovered by the Australian National Antarctic Research Expeditions (ANARE) in 1954, and was used regularly by ANARE relief ships in their approach to Mawson Station.

References

Sea passages of Antarctica
Bodies of water of Mac. Robertson Land